Patrick Bouchitey (born 11 August 1946) is a French actor and film director. He has appeared in over 80 films and television shows since 1972. His film Cold Moon was entered into the 1991 Cannes Film Festival.

Selected filmography

 La Meilleure façon de marcher (1976)
 Cold Moon (1991 - directed)
 1, 2, 3, Sun (1993)
 Neuf mois (1994)
 Beaumarchais (1996)
 Que la lumière soit (1998)
 Les Naufragés de la D17 (2002) - Paul Braud, le pilote
 Corto Maltese, la cour secrète des arcanes (2002) - Raspoutine (voice)
 Imposture (2005) - Serge Pommier
 Les Rois maudits (2005, TV Mini-Series) - Maître Evrard
 Les Aiguilles rouges (2006) - Le père d'Eric
 Max & Co (2007) - Rodolfo (voice)
 Tricheuse (2009) - Lavoisier
 My Afternoons with Margueritte (2010) - Landremont
 Moi, Michel G., milliardaire, maître du monde (2011) - Charles Prévost
 Sea, No Sex and Sun (2012) - Serge
 Edmond Was a Donkey (2012)
 L'Oncle Charles (2012) - Pierre, le voisin
 Victor Young Perez (2013) - Léon Bellières
 Les Têtes de l'emploi (2016) - Le père de Stéphane
 Capitaine Marleau (2017, TV Series) - Hugo Perez
 À nos pères (2018)

References

External links

1946 births
Living people
French male film actors
French film directors
French male screenwriters
French screenwriters
People from Haute-Saône